The 2019 GrønlandsBANKEN GM was the 49th edition of the Greenlandic Football Championship. The final round was held in Sisimiut from August 5 to 11. It was won by Nagdlunguaq-48 for the eleventh time in its history.

Qualifying stage

North Greenland
G-44 Qeqertarsuaq qualified for the Final Round.

Disko Bay

Central Greenland

South Greenland
Eqaluk-54 qualified for the Final Round. Kissaviarsuk-33, Nagtoralik Paamiut and Narsaq-85 failed to qualify.

Final Round

Playoffs

Fifth-place match

Third-place match

Final

See also
Football in Greenland
Football Association of Greenland
Greenland national football team
Greenlandic Men's Football Championship

References

Foot